

A positive pressure enclosure, also known as a welding habitat or hot work habitat, is a chamber used to provide a safe work environment for performing hot work in the presence of explosive gases or vapors.  They are used most often in welding environments and are associated with the offshore oil industry.

A positive pressure enclosure works by providing a constant inflow of breathable air, which in turn, causes gas to be continuously removed from the chamber.  This outflow of gases prevents the ingress of explosive gases or vapors, which are often present in such work locations.  This constant outflow of gases from the chamber also serves to cleanse the air within of undesirable gaseous by-products of the welding process.  Most commercial versions of positive pressure enclosures are referred to by their manufacturers as habitats.

The qualities of good indoor air quality  should include comfortable temperature and humidity, adequate supply of fresh outdoor air, and control of pollutants from inside and outside of the habitat. Indoor air quality (also called "indoor environmental quality") describes how inside air can affect a person's health comfort, and ability to work.  It can include temperature, humidity, lack of outside air (poor ventilation), mold from water damage, or exposure to other chemicals.  Currently, OSHA has no indoor air quality (IAQ) standards but it does provide guidelines for the most common IAQ workplace complaints. The habitat technician needs to provide daily practical solutions to ensure the workers inside habitat are safe and healthy.

Air Quality Assurance 
The air exchange rate inside the habitat should be maintained above 20 cycles per hour  in compliance with Factories and Machineries Act (Safety, Health and Welfare) Regulation 1970, under Regulation 25 - Ventilation. Air flow inside the habitat should be arranged in one-direction airflow with the inlet (at floor level) and outlet (at top level) at the furthest and opposite side. The ventilation flow rate of the habitat shall be 2,000 cfm from a clean source, per welder to dilute the polluted air inside the habitat.

Positive Pressure Assurance 
A minimum positive pressure of 0.1 inch of water or 0.00025 bar (equivalent to 25 Pascal or 0.00363 PSI) shall be maintained inside the Habitat enclosure to prevent ingestion of hydrocarbon in the event of leak occurred outside.

Heat Stress (Working Temperature) 
Maximum allowable temperature inside the Habitat enclosure is 40 Deg C. Work must stop when the temperature inside has reached above this allowable threshold. This is to prevent heat stress exposure of those working inside.

Technician Training and Competency 
The technicians must have attended the habitat manufacturer or operator in-house training on the habitat set-up, operations and basic maintenance. The technician must have attended training on Local Exhaust Ventilation (LEV) and able to calculate air exchange flow rate to ensure fumes generated from welding activity in the enclosure is maintained to acceptable limit.

Standards & Certification

IEC Standard
Almost all developed countries are members of the International Electrotechnical Commission (IEC). Positive pressure enclosures, or "welding habitats" are working on the principle of overpressure. This protection principle is regulated by IEC standard 60079-13:2017 Equipment protection by pressurized room "p". The IEC60079-13 standard forms the bases of welding habitat certification to the ATEX directive 2014/34/EU (mandatory for Europe), and the IECEx equipment certification scheme. The IEC60079-13 standard is adopted into national certification standards by changing the prefix to the applicable national prefix i.e. IEC60079-13 becomes BS EN 60079-13 (UK), or CAN/CSA C22.2 No 60079-13 (Canada), ANSI/UL 60079-13 (USA) etc. There may be some national foreword added to the IEC60079 series standard, but the main content of these national version of the IEC standards are identical to the IEC standard.

ATEX Certification
ATEX certification is the national certification standard of the European Union, and mandatory to operate equipment in explosive atmosphere in Europe. ATEX certification is not based on the IECEx certification scheme, certification is bases on the ATEX directive 2014/34/EU – see main article. Under the ATEX 2014/34/EU Directive, all equipment requires a proper manufacturer's EU Declaration of Conformity. For Zone 1 welding habitats this EU Declaration of Conformity must be based on a Notified Body issued EU–Type Examination Certificate for pressurized habitats (rooms) EN 60079-13.

Warning - there are habitat companies on the market that are using ATEX or IECEx component certification (the fan, the control unit, gas detection, lights, etc.) to convince customers that the habitat is ATEX compliant, but these habitats lack the required system certification to IEC60079-13. Practically the same as trying to convince someone about the roadworthiness of a car, by providing the certification for the tyres, lights, engine, etc., instead of the certificate for the car.

Welding habitat certification is not about the individual component compliance – that’s a given – it is about what the habitat as a system does: completely separating potential explosive atmosphere from hot work using a controlled overpressure system combined with an automatic shutdown unit certified to IEC60079-13.

IECEx Certification
The IECEx certification scheme is regulated by the IECEx 02 IEC System for Certification to Standards relating to Equipment for use in Explosive Atmospheres (IECEx System)

IECEx certification is more transparent than ATEX, as all certification is web-based and can be checked & downloaded on the IECEx certification website. IECEx certification is compulsory to operate electrical equipment in explosive atmosphere in most Countries outside Europe.

Australia, New Zealand, UAE, Malaysia, and the Philippines accept IECEx certification directly.

In Canada and the USA, all electrical equipment must bear the recognized Certification Mark of an accredited Certification Body, i.e., cQPS for Canada, QPSus for the USA and cQPSus for both, the USA and Canada. This QPS mark is only an extension of the IECEx certification - meaning IECEx + the national certificate (fee).

Brazil has the INMETRO regulations as their national extension of the IECEx certification scheme.

IECEx Certificate may be accepted in other jurisdictions where no National electrical safety system exists.

Warning - there are habitat companies on the market selling habitats with IEC60079-13 certification which is achieved under laboratory conditions. In reality these habitats cannot be constructed in compliance with the standard in real life operating conditions. Close attention should be paid to the certificate Annex detailing Conditions of Use and habitats should be inspected using IEC60079-13 to ensure commissioning and testing procedures have been correctly followed.

Operating principles

Flammability limits 
Flammable gases are not generally explosive under all conditions, and indeed, must be present within specific ranges in order to be explosive, or flammable.  Additionally, oxygen must be present. The flammability limits of gases are expressed in proportions to the other gases present.  For example, for methane, the lower explosive limit (LEL) is 4.4% and the upper explosive limit (UEL) is 17%.  A positive pressure enclosure works by making sure that the methane present in the work area never approaches the 4.4% LEL.

Positive pressure
The operating pressure inside a typical isolation chamber is set only marginally above local pressure; typically only 0.05 kilopascals (about 0.007 pounds per square inch) above local atmospheric pressure. This is sufficiently low to be undetectable (a person sitting in a bathtub full of water is exposed to greater pressures) to operators working inside the enclosure, but due to the leaky nature of the unit, ensures that the volume of air inside is constantly and rapidly changing. Intake air is piped into the enclosure by fan units.

See also

References

BP OIL SAF 120 Ventilation Guideline 

Working Together for Safety Recommendation 036E/2015
Within the petroleum industry, the term 'habitat' is used to describe an enclosed area with overpressure. Habitats are constructed from flame retardant materials. The overpressure prevents flammable gas from reaching hot work (e.g. welding) inside the habitat and igniting. With an associated control and shutdown system, a habitat is able to ensure the safe execution of hot work in classified areas under normal operating and production conditions. Conditions in unclassified areas may also make it necessary to use a habitat.
This recommendation assumes that a risk assessment has already been carried out, including an assessment of alternative methods (cold work, shutdown, etc.), and it has been decided that a habitat shall be used.

SfS Recommendation 036E Habitat 2015 NORWAY

Welding safety